Nan County, or Nanxian is a county in the Province of Hunan, China, it is under the administration of the prefecture-level city of Yiyang.

Located in the northern margin of the province, the county is bordered to the north by Shishou City of Hubei, to the northeast by Huarong County, to the east by Yueyang County, to the south by Yuanjiang County, to the southwest by Hanshou County and Dingcheng District of Changde City, to the northwest by Anxiang County. The county has 14 towns and 1 township under its jurisdiction, the county seat is Nanzhou.

Administrative divisions
Through the amalgamation of township-level divisions in Nan County on November 26, 2015, Nan County had 13 towns and 2 townships under its jurisdiction. In 2017, the township of Zhongyukou was reorganized as a town, the county has a township and 14 towns.;

14 towns
 Beizhouzi
 Changjiao
 Heba, Nan County: Merging Shabaozhou Town and the former Heba Town on November 26, 2015.
 Huage
 Jinpen
 Langbahu
 Mahekou, Nan County
 Maocaojie
 Mingshantou
 Nanzhou, Nan County
 Qingshuzui
 Sanxianhu
 Wushenggong
 Zhongyukou

a township
 Wuzui

Climate

References

www.xzqh.org

External links 

 
County-level divisions of Hunan
Geography of Yiyang